Tyrone Britt (born April 18, 1944) is a retired American basketball player.

He played collegiately for the Johnson C. Smith University.

He played for the San Diego Rockets (1967–68) in the NBA for 11 games.

External links

1944 births
Living people
American men's basketball players
Guards (basketball)
Johnson C. Smith Golden Bulls basketball players
San Diego Rockets players
Undrafted National Basketball Association players